In statistical genetics, Felsenstein's tree-pruning algorithm (or Felsenstein's tree-peeling algorithm), attributed to Joseph Felsenstein, is an algorithm for computing the likelihood of an evolutionary tree from nucleic acid sequence data. 

The algorithm is often used as a subroutine in a search for a maximum likelihood estimate for an evolutionary tree.  Further, it can be used in a hypothesis test for whether evolutionary rates are constant (by using likelihood ratio tests).  It can also be used to provide error estimates for the parameters describing an evolutionary tree.

References

Statistical genetics